The Andromeda Evolution is a 2019 novel written by Daniel H. Wilson. It is a sequel to Michael Crichton's The Andromeda Strain, published 50 years prior in 1969. It is the nineteenth and final novel under Crichton's name, and the fourth and final novel published after Crichton's death.

Plot
Fifty years after the events of The Andromeda Strain an anomaly is discovered in the Amazon rainforest. A team made up of Nidhi Vedala, Harold Odhiambo, Peng Wu, Eduardo Brink, and Sophie Kline are selected to investigate the anomaly. James Stone, the son of Jeremy Stone, is chosen as a last-minute replacement on the team by overseer General Stern based on a hunch. The team is dispatched to the Amazon, minus Sophie Kline, who is an American astronaut residing at the International Space Station.

The group's travel towards the anomaly is met with disaster when local tribesmen attack during the night in a strangely violent manner. Brink and the native guides leading the group are slaughtered. Peng finds Brink's body the following day and discovers a vial of Omega poison in his bag. She keeps the poison, as she's unable to trust the others due to a pre-existing anxiety disorder. Upon investigating the tribesmen's bodies the group discovers that they were infected with a new strain of Andromeda: AS-3. Odhiambo finds that the tribesmen were accompanied by a little boy, Tupa, who bonds with Stone. 

The group contacts Kline in an attempt to pass information along to Stern, as the jungle environment makes it difficult to contact anyone other than the space station. Led to believe that Brink is still alive, Kline gives them a coded message to pass along telling him to use the Omega poison on the scientists. Upon reaching the anomaly they find that it is growing and has formed a building. They enter it and discover the bodies of several workers, as well as a control hatch, at which point Kline contacts them and tells them that they should not have come. Peng has a panic attack as the floor begins to become quicksand. She flees rather than enter the hatch with the others and becomes infected. With her dying breath she reveals that Andromeda is on every planetary body in the solar system. It was alien machinery, looking for other life forms. It is then revealed that Kline had been working against the Andromeda and built the anomaly to this end. 

The remaining scientists and Tupa continue down the hatch but discover that it is filling up with river water. Vedala manages to get to the other end and open up the hatch, but Odhiambo is unable to move fast enough and drowns before he can get to safety. Now down to just Stone, Vedala, and Tupa, the trio discover that Kline has created a space elevator. The two scientists travel up the elevator and face Kline, but find that she is unwilling to compromise her plans. Stone is ultimately forced to kill her using the Omega poison. It is revealed that Stone is the baby from the first incident, Jamie Ritter, and that his exposure to the first infection has made him effectively immune to Andromeda. 

Realizing that Andromeda has morphed into a new, even more deadly form, Stone chooses to sever the thread of Andromeda serving as the chain for the space elevator, almost dying in the process. He is successful in this task, saving the world. Stone is reunited with Tupa and Vedala. In the epilogue Stone and Vedala get married and petition to adopt Tupa while Stern and a group of other scientists notice that Andromeda has reached Saturn and is directly connecting to an unknown extraterrestrial source.

Main characters
General R. Stern: A four-star US general in command of NORAD (Colorado), leader of the Amazon mission.
Dr. James Stone: The son of Dr. Jeremy Stone, robotics and artificial intelligence expert. (also a Piedmont, Arizona AS-1 survivor)
Dr. Nidhi Vedala: A nanotechnology expert who developed a spray to prevent infection by Andromeda AS-3 particles.
Dr. Sophie Kline: An ISS astronaut and expert in robotics and nanotechnology, who suffers from ALS.
Peng Wu: A soldier, doctor, pathologist and former taikonaut who suffers from an anxiety/panic disorder.
Harold Odhiambo: A scientist well-studied in anthropology, biology, and geology.
Tupa: A 10-year-old boy, the sole survivor of an Amazon tribe wiped out by the AS-3.

Development
Development of the book began when Crichton's widow, Sherri, chose to approach a writer to pen a sequel to The Andromeda Strain. She cited her reason as "that I don’t want Michael’s classic body of work to be forgotten.” Writer Daniel H. Wilson was approached to write the sequel and Sherri retained final approval of the book before publication. Wilson conducted research with NASA at the Johnson Space Center and explored a mockup space station and spoke with Robonaut 2 scientists. He has stated that he wanted to acknowledge both the original book while also taking into account the travel and advances made in space exploration since the 1970s.

Reception 
The Washington Post noted that "Predictable as this group is, their adventure is at least as exciting as Crichton’s original story — and considerably more active. The jungle provides an ominous setting for some spooky scenes. And the episodes set in outer space are particularly thrilling." USA Today also reviewed the book, writing "In the end, The Andromeda Evolution explodes with an unexpected, gripping, cinematic finale, ready-made. Crichton and techno-thriller fans will be entertained, if not awed."

References

2019 American novels
2019 science fiction novels
Techno-thriller novels
Action novels
American biopunk novels
Eco-thriller novels
Sequel novels
Novels by Michael Crichton
HarperCollins books